Revelstoke is a city in southeastern British Columbia, Canada, with a census population of 8,275 in 2021. The city is situated on the banks of the Columbia River just south of the Revelstoke Dam and near its confluence with the Illecillewaet River. East of Revelstoke are the Selkirk Mountains and Glacier National Park, penetrated by Rogers Pass used by the Trans-Canada Highway and the Canadian Pacific Railway. South of the community down the Columbia River are the Arrow Lakes, Mount Begbie, and the Kootenays. West of the city is Eagle Pass through the Monashee Mountains and the route to Shuswap Lake.

History

Revelstoke was founded in the 1880s when the Canadian Pacific Railway (CPR) was built through the area; mining was an important early industry. The name was originally Farwell, after a local land owner and surveyor. In yet earlier days, the spot was called the Second Crossing, to differentiate it from the first crossing of the Columbia River by the Canadian Pacific Railway at Donald. The city was named by the Canadian Pacific Railway in appreciation of Lord Revelstoke, head of Baring Brothers & Co., the UK investment bank that, in partnership with Glyn, Mills & Co., saved the Canadian Pacific Railway from bankruptcy in the summer of 1885 by buying the company's unsold bonds, enabling the railway to reach completion. The post office dates from 1886.

The construction of the Trans-Canada Highway in 1962 further eased access to the region, and since then tourism has been an important feature of the local economy, with skiing having emerged as the most prominent attraction. Mount Revelstoke National Park is just north of the town. The construction of Revelstoke Mountain Resort, a major new ski resort on Mount MacKenzie, just outside town, has been underway since late 2005, and first opened during the 2007-2008 ski season. Revelstoke is also the site of a railway museum.

Revelstoke is situated in prime black bear and grizzly bear habitat. In 1994 the Revelstoke garbage dump was fenced with an electric fence excluding bears from feeding on the garbage.  The population of bears that had been feeding at the dump turned to town to forage for food and many were destroyed as "nuisance bears". The destruction of so many bears led to the creation of an education program meant to keep bears wild and the community safe.

Revelstoke holds the Canadian record for snowiest single winter.  of snow fell on Mt. Copeland outside town during the winter of 1971–72. The townsite received , and snow levels were higher than many roofs around town by more than a few metres.

Economy

Revelstoke's economy has traditionally been tied to the Canadian Pacific Railway (CPR) and it still maintains a strong connection to that industry. However, forestry, construction, tourism, and retail have increased over the past decades. The Revelstoke Railway Museum is a recognition of the town's continued attachment to the Canadian Pacific Railway and continues to be an important tourist attraction.

As one of the first small BC communities to have fiber internet installed, remote workers, freelancers, tech workers and entrepreneurs are main drivers of the growth of Revelstoke. Mountain CoLab Coworking was founded in 2015 to serve these professionals growing to approximately 100 full-time members in 2020. Its Founder Jean-Marc La Flamme also created Startup Revelstoke to support growing startups with mentorship, coaching and events. Some notable local tech companies supported include Cronometer and Sniper Action Photo.

Revelstoke is also the location of the Revelstoke Dam which was constructed on the Columbia River, and completed in 1984. In 1986, to offset the economic effects of the completed hydroelectric project and the temporary closure of the local sawmill, the City of Revelstoke undertook a downtown revitalization program and it was completed with marked success.

The city is served by Revelstoke Airport.

A small ski resort featuring a single short lift has operated on Mount MacKenzie since the 1960s, and snowcat skiing was offered for higher altitudes. A strong movement pushed to expand the entire mountain into a single resort, and construction started in the early 2000s (decade).

Revelstoke Mountain Resort opened in the winter of 2007/8 and boasts North America's greatest vertical at 1,713 metres (5,620 ft).

The resort also offers 3,121 acres of fall line skiing, high alpine bowls, 13 areas of gladed terrain and more groomed terrain. Revelstoke Mountain Resort was also the only resort world-wide to offer lift, cat, heli and backcountry skiing from one village base. Though economic conditions starting in late 2008 have deferred its initial plans, the resort will continue development with new lifts, hotels and a golf course planned for 2022.

Demographics

Ethnicity

Religion 
According to the 2021 census, religious groups in Revelstoke included:
Irreligion (5,645 persons or 69.0%)
Christianity (2,265 persons or 27.7%)
Islam (55 persons or 0.7%)
Buddhism (40 persons or 0.5%)
Hinduism (40 persons or 0.5%)
Sikhism (35 persons or 0.4%)
Judaism (10 persons or 0.1%)
Other (95 persons or 1.2%)

Sports

Revelstoke has produced some talented athletes in winter sports, notably ice hockey.

The former local BCJHL team, the Revelstoke Bruins, had a number of future NHLers on its roster in the 1970s and 1980s, including Bruce Holloway, Ron Flockhart, and Rudy Poeschek. The current Revelstoke Kootenay International Junior Hockey League team is the Revelstoke Grizzlies, the former KIJHL team of locally born Aaron Volpatti. Another notable professional hockey player for the Austrian Hockey League is Andrew Kozek who was also born in Revelstoke.

Norwegian immigrants brought skiing and ski jumping to Revelstoke, and by the 1910s, several ski jumping hills had been built around town. Revelstoke Ski Club was founded in 1914, and by the following year had reached 102 members. The pinnacle of the club was the annual Winter Carnival Tournament. The first tournament was held in 1915, and had, in addition to cross-country skiing competitions, ski jumping competitions for boys under 16 and the title of Champion of British Columbia. Nels Nelsen Hill, first known as Big Hill, opened in 1916. Revelstoke became an international center for ski jumping, attracting the world elite for the annual tournament. Revelstoke's own Nels Nelsen set the world records in the hill, at 73 meters (240 ft) in 1925 and  set by Bob Lymburne in 1932. The hill was completely renovated by 1948, leading to further international tournaments. The town even considered placing a bid for the 1968 Winter Olympics. However, throughout the 1960s, the interest in ski jumping was declining, with subsequent consequences for the number of spectators. The last tournament was held in 1975.

Due to the heavy snowfall in the area, Revelstoke is home to four heli-skiing and two cat-skiing operations. There are numerous backcountry skiing lodges in the area. Revelstoke is also a major snowmobiling destination.

In the summer, mountain biking, rock climbing, whitewater rafting and kayaking are popular activities.

In 2010, Revelstoke became part of a select group of ski resorts to feature the Freeskiing World Tour. After a successful trial of combining European and North American skiing tours starting with Revelstoke in 2012, the Swatch Freeride World Tour, Freeskiing World Tour and The North Face Masters of Snowboarding announced a merger that combined all three tours under one unified global 5-star championship series. The six-stop world tour named the Swatch Freeride World Tour by the North Face includes freeride skiing and snowboarding at each stop starting with Revelstoke, Canada and ending with Verbier, Switzerland.

Starting in 2015 Revelstoke has hosted the Red Bull Cold Rush, fusing the disciplines of backcountry slopestyle, big mountain, cliffs, and alpine ski touring. The world's premier skiers are invited to battle it out for a chunk of the $36,000 prize purse awarded in a peer-judged format to the most versatile, well-rounded athletes.

In 2011, Revelstoke locals Michael Curran and Stephanie Ells formed Revelstoke Roller Derby Association. The league's premier team, the Derailers, held its debut bouts in the summer of 2012 and won both home games.

Education
School District 19 Revelstoke operates public schools in Revelstoke and surrounding areas.

The Conseil scolaire francophone de la Colombie-Britannique operates one Francophone school: école des Glaciers primary school.

Films

The 1937 British movie The Great Barrier, starring Lilli Palmer, depicted the building of the Canadian Pacific Railway and featured location shooting from Revelstoke.

Some scenes in the 1999 thriller Double Jeopardy, starring Ashley Judd and Tommy Lee Jones, were filmed in Revelstoke, notably the historic courthouse.

The Barber (2001), starring Malcolm McDowell, was almost entirely filmed in Revelstoke and features the town name displaced as Revelstoke, Alaska.

In 2017, the Hallmark Channel original movie Frozen in Love, starring Rachael Leigh Cook and Niall Matter, was filmed in the area.

Climate

Revelstoke experiences a humid continental climate (Köppen Dfb). Summers are generally warm and rainy with cool nights, while winters are cold, snowy and very cloudy. Revelstoke on average experiences 50.3 days below 0 °C (32 °F), 13.5 days above 30 °C (86 °F) and one day above 35 °C (95 °F). The highest single-day snowfall recorded was 60.2 cm (23.7 in) and occurred on December 10, 1980, and the highest-ever snow depth recorded was 173 cm (68.1 in) and occurred on February 15, 1982.

Neighbourhoods 
There are 14 officially recognized neighbourhoods within the City of Revelstoke.

Arrow Heights
Big Eddy
Central Business
Central Revelstoke
Clearview Heights
Columbia Park
Farewell/Mountain View
Highway Corridor
Kelly Flats/Dalles
Resort Lands
South Revelstoke
Johnson Heights
Thomas Brook
Westside Road

Notable people
Sophie Atkinson
Douglas Boyle
Buck Crump
Bruce Holloway
William Stewart King
Andrew Kozek
Peter Morales
John Nunziata
Sid Parker
Thomas Scott
Robert Fletcher Shaw
Aaron Volpatti

See also

Revelstoke Secondary School

Notes

References

Sources

Canadian Railway Hall of Fame

External links

 
Cities in British Columbia
British Columbia populated places on the Columbia River
All pages needing cleanup